The 1996 NCAA Division I Women's Tennis Championships were the 15th annual championships to determine the national champions of NCAA Division I women's singles, doubles, and team collegiate tennis in the United States.

Florida defeated Stanford in the championship final, 5–2, to claim their second national title.

Host
This year's tournaments were hosted by Florida State University at the Scott Speicher Tennis Center in Tallahassee, Florida.

The men's and women's NCAA tennis championships would not be held jointly until 2006.

See also
NCAA Division II Tennis Championships (Men, Women)
NCAA Division III Tennis Championships (Men, Women)

References

External links
List of NCAA Women's Tennis Champions

NCAA Division I tennis championships
NCAA Division I Women's Tennis Championships
NCAA Division I Women's Tennis Championships
NCAA Division I Women's Tennis Championships